Cannery Row is the waterfront street bordering the city of Pacific Grove, but officially in the New Monterey section of Monterey, California. It was the site of a number of now-defunct sardine canning factories. The last cannery closed in 1973. The street name, formerly a nickname for Ocean View Avenue, became official in January 1958 to honor John Steinbeck and his novel Cannery Row. In the novel's opening sentence, Steinbeck described the street as "a poem, a stink, a grating noise, a quality of light, a tone, a habit, a nostalgia, a dream."

History
Cannery Row was the setting of John Steinbeck's novels Cannery Row (1945) and Sweet Thursday (1954). Both were the basis for the 1982 movie Cannery Row, starring Nick Nolte and Debra Winger.  It is also mentioned in Bob Dylan's song "Sad Eyed Lady of the Lowlands".
Pacific Biological Laboratories, a biological supply house, was located at 800 Ocean View Avenue (now 800 Cannery Row) from 1928 to 1948, and operated by Edward F. Ricketts, who was the inspiration for several characters in Steinbeck novels. The laboratory is still preserved. Across from the laboratory still exists a Chinese-American-owned store mentioned in both Cannery Row and Sweet Thursday, as well as a vacant lot that was the "home" of some of the homeless characters in the novel. The former reflects Chinese American history in the area, starting with Chinese immigrants who entered the fishing industry, exporting seafood and abalone shells to China, Europe, and other parts of the U.S. At 851 Cannery Row, across from Pacific Biological Laboratories, is the original building that inspired the bar from the novel named La Ida Cafe.

Cannery Row was adjoined by a grand mansion owned by Montana mining tycoon James A. Murray. Known as "Casa de las Olas" or the Murray Hacienda, the mansion was demolished in the 1940s to make way for the expansion of more canneries. A historical marker is located on the site of the former mansion. The canneries failed after the collapse of the fishing industry in Monterey Bay in the mid-1950s, which resulted from a combination of factors, including unfavorable oceanic conditions, overfishing, and competition from other species. In his investigation of where the sardines had gone, Ed Ricketts finally concluded "They're in cans." Before the collapse, the fishery was one of the most productive in the world due to the upwelling of cold yet nutrient-rich water along the California coastline.

Today
Today the area offshore from Cannery Row is the Edward F. Ricketts State Marine Conservation Area (part of the larger Monterey Bay National Marine Sanctuary)  and is home to a large resurgent population of California sea lions.

Cannery Row itself is now a tourist attraction with many restaurants and hotels, several of which are located in former cannery buildings, and a few historic attractions. Some privately owned fishing companies still exist on Cannery Row, housed on piers located a short distance from the historic district frequented by tourists.

In recent years, Cannery Row has become increasingly popular among sport fishermen due to extensive public fishing facilities. MacAbee Beach and San Carlos Beach, which bookend Cannery Row are both popular spots for kayak-launching; San Carlos Beach is one of Monterey Bay's most popular scuba-diving spots.

The Monterey Bay Aquarium (opened in 1984) is located at the north end of Cannery Row, at the former site of the major Hovden Cannery. Norwegian immigrant Knut Hovden founded Hovden Food Products Corporation which opened on July 7, 1916. By canning squid at the end of its life, Hovden Cannery managed to outlast its neighbors, finally closing its doors in 1973 when it became the last cannery on the row to close. In November, 2021 it is announced that Cannery Row will open 'Cannery Row: Treasure Hunt' - a pirate themed ride - in 2022.

See also
John Steinbeck
Ed Ricketts
Bruce Ariss
 List of canneries
Monterey Bay Aquarium

References

Further reading

NPR's Morning Edition: Ed Ricketts and the 'Dream' of Cannery Row
The Stevenson Plan, A Novel of the Monterey Peninsula (M. Bryce Ternet, 2013)

External links 

Cannery Row
The Cannery Row Foundation
The Pat Hathaway Photo Collection: Cannery Row, Historic Monterey
City of Monterey's Cannery Row Walking Tour

Seafood canneries
Neighborhoods in Monterey, California
Monterey Bay
History of Monterey County, California
History of the Monterey Bay Area
Landmarks in California
Tourist attractions in Monterey, California